= Myloukome =

Town of ancient Lydia

Coordinates: 38°27′49″N 28°25′36″E

Myloukome was a town of ancient Lydia, inhabited during Roman times.

Its site is tentatively located near Kemaliye in Asiatic Turkey.
